The Big Apple Comic Con is a New York City comic book convention, the longest-running comic book/speculative fiction/pop culture convention in New York City. It was started by retailer Michael "Mike Carbo" Carbonaro in March 1996 in the basement of the St. Paul the Apostle Church. During its heyday from 2001 to 2008, the Big Apple Comic Con often featured multiple shows per year, with a large three-day "national" convention held in November, usually held at the Penn Plaza Pavilion. The show was owned by Wizard Entertainment from 2009 to 2013, but was reacquired by Carbonaro in 2014.

Over the course of its history, the convention has been known as the Big Apple Convention, the Big Apple Comic Book Art, and Toy Show, and the Big Apple Comic Book, Art, Toy & Sci-Fi Expo; with the larger three-day November shows known as the National Comic Book, Art, Toy, and Sci-Fi Expo, the National Comic Book, Art, and Sci-Fi Expo, and the National Comic Book, Comic Art, and Fantasy Convention. In 2014, the name "Big Apple Convention" was revived by Carbonaro for its March 2015 show.

Though it primarily focuses on comic books, the convention features a large range of pop culture elements, such as books, cinema, science fiction/fantasy, television, animation, anime, manga, toys, horror, collectible card games, video games, webcomics, and fantasy novels. Along with panels, seminars, and workshops with comic book professionals, the Big Apple Comic Con often features previews of upcoming films, and such evening events as the costume contest overseen by "Captain Zorikh" Zorikh Lequidre.

The convention regularly hosts hundreds of artists, exhibitors, and film and television personalities in a huge floorspace for exhibitors. The show includes autograph and photo op opportunities with all of the guests, as well as the Artists' Alley where comics artists can sign autographs and sell or do free sketches.

History

Antecedents 
Major comic book conventions in New York City prior to the Big Apple Comic Con included Dave Kaler's Academy Con, which ran annually from 1965 to 1967; Phil Seuling's Comic Art Convention, which ran annually from 1968 to 1983 (Seuling died in 1984); and the large annual Creation conventions, usually taking place over the weekend following Thanksgiving from 1971 to 1987. (Creation sometimes put on as many as a half-dozen smaller New York City shows per year). From 1993 to 1995, promoter Frederic Greenberg began hosting Great Eastern Conventions shows annually at venues including the Jacob K. Javits Convention Center. (Great Eastern also ran shows in New Jersey, Pennsylvania, and Massachusetts.) Other companies, including Dynamic Forces, held New York City conventions, but all were on a smaller scale than the Seuling shows. Changes in the industry, popular culture, and the resurgent city itself since the troubled 1960s and '70s made large-scale comic-book conventions difficult to hold profitably. Jonah Weiland of ComicBookResources.com also noted that "... dealing with the various convention unions made it difficult for most groups to get a show off the ground."

Birth of the show 
On February 29, 1996, just two days before it was to start, Fred Greenberg cancelled what had been advertised as a larger-than-usual Great Eastern show, scheduled for March 2–3 at the New York Coliseum, which the fan press had suggested might herald a successor to the 1968–1983 Comic Art Convention.
 
On the spur of the moment, comic book retailers Michael Carbonaro, Vince Gulla, and Vincent Zurzuolo, all of whom had planned to sell their wares at the Great Eastern show, mounted a substitute convention in the basement of the Church of St. Paul the Apostle. The gathering — dubbed "ChurchCon," "Hallelujah Con," or "The Show Must Go On" Con — attracted over 4,000 attendees, most of whom had been planning to attend the scheduled Great Eastern Show. Thus was born the Big Apple Comic Con, thereafter produced exclusively by Carbnonaro.

Growth 
After the success of the initial 1996 show, Big Apple scheduled six separate conventions in 1997.

In 1998, Big Apple held three conventions, in March, April, and October.

In November 1999, (after a typical March show held at the Church of St. Paul the Apostle), Big Apple inaugurated the three-day "National Expo", held at the Metropolitan Pavilion on West 18th Street in Manhattan. The National Expo brought "together the National Comic Book, Comic Art and Fantasy Convention and the New York Toy, Sci-Fi and Collectible Show;" the larger annual National shows were held every year from 1999 until 2008; other shows (until 2004) continued to be held at the Church of St. Paul the Apostle. 

Over the years, the Big Apple con attracted many comics creators and pop culture figures.

Heyday 

By 2004 (which saw four separate shows), the convention had moved to the Penn Plaza Pavilion at the Hotel Pennsylvania. 

Big Apple Comic Con was characterized as being in "growth mode" in 2005–2006, with five shows per year and an average attendance of about 8,000 guests per show.

Acquisition by Wizard Entertainment 
In 2009, the Big Apple Comic Con was purchased by Gareb Shamus of Wizard Entertainment; Michael Carbonaro was retained as a senior adviser. The first show under Wizard was held October 2009 at Pier 94 in Manhattan. 

The acquisition of Big Apple was part of a concerted push by Wizard's CEO Gareb Shamus to dominate the North American convention circuit, including acquiring the Paradise Comics Toronto Comicon. As part of that strategy, Wizard initially scheduled the 2010 Big Apple Comic Con for October 7–10, the exact same dates as the previously scheduled 2010 New York Comic Con, run by Reed Exhibitions. After a public outcry, Wizard later moved the dates of its 2010 New York convention to October 1–3.

Wizard held a new "Wizard World New York City Experience" show on June 28–30, 2013.

New York Comic Book Marketplace 
In 2009, Michael Carbonaro established his own independent one-day convention known as the New York Comic Book Marketplace which ran annually through 2014.

Though not branded as a "Big Apple Convention" and not affiliated with Wizard World, some might consider the next iteration of the Big Apple Comic Con to have been held on March 31, 2012, at the Penn Plaza Pavilion. It was Michael Carbonaro's third New York Comic Book Marketplace, and (prematurely) announced as Carbonaro's final convention. The guest of honor was Stan Lee; other guests included George Pérez, Joe Sinnott, Dick Ayers, Carmine Infantino, Jim Steranko, Irwin Hasen, Mike Royer, Arthur Suydam, Bob McLeod, Rich Buckler, and Johnny Brennan, and Captain Zorikh's costume contest.

Carbonaro held another NYCBM at the Hotel Pennsylvania on April 13, 2013.

Reacquisition by Mike Carbonaro
Carbonaro reacquired the convention from Wizard in 2014. (By 2017, New York Comic Con, held annually at the Jacob K. Javits Convention Center, had grown to rival that of San Diego Comic-Con, making it the dominant New York City-area comic convention.) The December 2015 edition of Carbonaro's convention, titled the New York Winter Comic & Sci-Fi Expo, was held at the Resorts World Casino New York in Jamaica, New York, and was co-produced by Carbonaro and Frank Patz.

With the holiday-themed December 2019 iteration of the show, the Big Apple Comic Con moved locations to the New Yorker Hotel. The 2020 show, scheduled for April 4–5, was canceled due to the COVID-19 Pandemic. The 2021 show, held September 25–26, was the Big Apple Comic Con's Silver Anniversary show; it was also the first in-person comics convention held in New York City since the pandemic.

In 2022, Carbonaro hosted another iteration of the Big Apple Comic Con (on March 26, 2022); he also hosted (along with promoter Laz Rivero) the first Big Apple Trading Card Show, held on January 29, 2022, at the New Yorker Hotel. The trading card show featured baseball, football, basketball, Pokémon, Magic: The Gathering cards, and more.

Criticism 
Comics creator Evan Dorkin was a critic of the Big Apple Con. He singled out the November 2008 show in particular as "the worst convention I've ever had the displeasure to sit through", for the lackluster celebrity guests, the lack of floor plan guides for attendees, inconsistently-functioning restrooms, elevator, and escalators, the poorly performing volunteer staff, and an overall seedy, flea market atmosphere of rude dealers, creators inattentive to fans, and attendees who were disproportionately male. Dorkin, who vowed never to return to the venue, also singled out the cramped space of the venue, in particular Artist's Alley, which he speculated may have constituted a fire hazard.

Similarly, journalist Heidi MacDonald criticized the Penn Plaza Pavilion location as "eight pounds of sh-t in a five-pound bag." Journalist Rich Johnston said the conventions held there were "a little cramped and hot, but I still thoroughly enjoyed [them]."

Dates and locations

See also 
 List of comic book conventions

References

External links 

 
 
 It Came From The Radio — official radio show of Big Apple Comic Con, hosted by Sunburst creator Mark Torres, with co-hosts Senior Correspondent Charlie Saladino; model, actress, stand-up comedian, and producer El Man Jenny Feldy; and Dominic Sparano

Recurring events established in 1996
1996 establishments in New York City
Culture of Manhattan
Comics conventions in the United States
Conventions in New York City